The Bonnie Raitt Collection is the first compilation album by Bonnie Raitt. It includes songs from her first nine albums while with Warner Brothers, which were released from 1971 to 1986. Raitt would go on to have much greater success with her stint with Capitol Records.

Critical reception

William Ruhlmann of AllMusic concludes his review of The Bonnie Raitt Collection with, "Even taking into account differences in taste, Raitt's choices run in the face of the preferences of fans and critics to the point that the album fails to make the case for her Warners recordings as true expressions of her talents, a case that could have been made decisively with a better selection."

Greg Sandow of Entertainment Weekly writes, "this compendium justifies itself by its quality. It reveals Raitt first as a 21-year-old blues singer, performing songs with titles like "Finest Lovin' Man" in an aching, pure voice. But already she was adding depth and, often, sadness to what she sang." He gives the album an "A" rating.

Mark Cooper of Q Magazine writes, "This personally selected compilation is a testament to Raitt's ability to make songs her own and further evidence that she isn't always the best judge of her own material."

Track listing

All track information and credits taken from the album's liner notes.

References

External links
Bonnie Raitt Official Site
Warner Brothers Records Official Site
Capitol Records Official Site

1990 greatest hits albums
Bonnie Raitt compilation albums
Warner Records compilation albums